Lucrezia Borgia is an 1833 play by the French writer Victor Hugo. It is a historical work portraying the Renaissance-era Italian aristocrat Lucrezia Borgia. The play (along with Angelo, Tyrant of Padua) is believed to have been a major influence on Oscar Wilde's The Duchess of Padua (1891).

Adaptations
The opera Lucrezia Borgia composed by Gaetano Donizetti had a libretto by Felice Romani which was based on Hugo's play. Several films about Borgia and her family have drawn partly on the plot of the play.

Bibliography
 Kohl, Norbert. Oscar Wilde: The Works of a Conformist Rebel. Cambridge University Press, 2011

References

External links

1833 plays
Plays set in Italy
Plays by Victor Hugo
Plays set in the 15th century
Plays set in the 16th century
Plays based on real people
Plays adapted into operas
Cultural depictions of Cesare Borgia
Cultural depictions of Lucrezia Borgia
Cultural depictions of Pope Alexander VI